The Cornish National Liberation Army (CNLA) was a short-lived Cornish nationalist paramilitary organisation that threatened to perform acts of vandalism and arson against commercial targets that it considers to be English, in Cornwall.

History
In 2007 an email claiming to be from the Cornish National Liberation Army, threatened celebrity chefs Jamie Oliver and Rick Stein. The following month a 36-year-old man was arrested for making the threats.

It has been described by the Cornish political party, Mebyon Kernow, as a 'pseudo-terrorist group'.  Dick Cole, spokesman for Mebyon Kernow, released a statement  to various London papers.

The group also opposed the flying of the English flag in Cornwall, and has threatened to destroy all English flags in the region.

There is little evidence as to the size of the CNLA other than an August 2007 interview in Cornish World Magazine in which Stuart Ramsay claims they have thirty members.

Cornish Republican Army 
In November 2007, Per Svenssonn, a writer for the internet periodical Ciudadanos Europeos, successfully gained an email interview with a member of the CRA through the Cornwall24 website's forum. As well as confirming the name change, the interview outlined (among other topics) the structure of the organisation, confirmed official CRA attacks and suggested future plans.

When questioned on forthcoming events, the CRA spokesperson answered:
"2008 promises to be an interesting year for the English occupying forces and their establishment. Beyond that, no comment."

A hoax took place in March 1974 when students from Plymouth Polytechnic styled themselves the 'FCA' (Free Cornish Army)
as part of a Rag Week stunt and convinced some of the Fleet Street press that Cornwall had declared independence.

Arrests
The police arrested three people in Cornwall, accused of having some connection with the CNLA. None of those arrested were formally charged. The Celtic League wrote to the Chief Constable of Devon and Cornwall Police to protest the arrests, describing those arrested as members of the League's Kernow Branch, and expressing 'alarm' at the arrests.

In popular culture
In the 2015 film, The Bad Education Movie, based on The TV series of the same name, Alfie Wickers and class K go to Cornwall, but accidentally get involved with the Cornish Liberation Army, a terrorist organisation fighting for Cornish independence.

References

External links

 Fighting them on the beaches, Guardian, 15 June 2007

2006 establishments in the United Kingdom
Cornish nationalism
Republicanism in England
Separatism in the United Kingdom
Organizations established in 2006
Anti-English sentiment
Cornish militarism